The Saipan Tribune is a newspaper published online seven days a week and in print from Monday to Friday in the Northern Mariana Islands. The Saipan Tribune is headquartered in Saipan. The newspaper is owned by Pacific Publications and Printing Inc., which is an affiliate of the Tan Holdings Corporation. Its main competitor is the Marianas Variety News & Views.

See also

List of newspapers in the Northern Mariana Islands

References

Newspapers published in the Northern Mariana Islands
Daily newspapers published in the United States
English-language newspapers published in Oceania
Mass media in the Northern Mariana Islands